Journey is the second studio album by a Filipina singer - songwriter Yeng Constantino, released on February 29, 2008 via Star Music. The album contains twelve tracks: six were composed by Constantino, two were a collaboration of Constantino and Morning Glory. Journey sold more than 15,000 copies and is certified Gold. It was followed by her third album, Lapit.

Track listing
 "Di Na Ganun" (Constantino) -  4:57
 "Ikaw Lang Talaga" (Constantino) -  2:52
 "Promise" (Constantino) - 4:23
 "Pili Ka Lang" (Constantino) -  3:55
 "Tao Lang Ako"  ( Constantino ) - 4:44
 "What About Us"  (Constantino) -  4:33
 "Himig Ng Pag-ibig"  (Lolita Carbon) -  4:21
 "Bakit Nga Ba" ( Annabelle Ragalado-Borja [Words] & Allan Danug [Music] ) - 3:49
 "If You Go" (Eman Abatayo) -  4:58
 "Why Can't You" (Constantino & Morning Glory) -  4:03
 "Tala" (Constantino & Morning Glory) -  4:09
 "Habambuhay" ( Annabelle Ragalado-Borja [Words] & Allan Danug [Music] ) - 3:53

Singles
 Habambuhay was a single, used as the Official Theme Song for the 2008 blockbuster Movie, "Sakal, Sakali, Saklolo" starring Judy Ann Santos & Ryan Agoncillo where it is nominated for the Best Theme Song of the Year.
 Ikaw Lang Talaga this was the second single off this album. This was used as official theme song for the Taiwannovela Why Why Love & Miss No Good starring Rainie Yang.
 Di Na Ganun was the third single, was used as sub-theme for the television series starring Anne Curtis, The Wedding. As well as Promise.
 Himig Ng Pag-Ibig was the last single, it was used as Official Theme song for the Hit Primetime Fantasy starring Anne Curtis, Dyosa.

Just Like for her previous album, Most of Constantino's Singles from the Journey Album were used as theme songs for ABS-CBN's Teleserye & Movie Outfit.

Chart performance
"Journey", had debuted at No. 14 on March 15, 2008 and peaked at No. 8 by the end of the month. It stayed for three months in the Top 20 Albums of 2008.

Certification
Journey's Gold Certification was given to Yeng in August 2009 at the TV program ASAP.

Awards and recognition
2009
 WRR 101.9 WAKI OPM Award: "Best Album of the year" - "Journey".

2008
 Pop Music Video ("Himig ng Pag-Ibig"): ASAP Pop Viewer's Choice Awards 2008

References

Yeng Constantino albums
2008 albums